Juan Antonio González Iglesias (born 1964 in Salamanca) is a Spanish poet. He was the 2006 winner of the Loewe in poetry

Prizes 

Premio Vicente Núñez en 1993.
IV Premio Internacional de Poesía Generación del 27
XIX Premio Loewe

Translations 

. Málaga. Rafael Inglada Ediciones, 1996.
Arte de amar. Amores, de Ovidio. Madrid, Ediciones Cátedra, 1993.
Poesías, de Catulo. Madrid, Ediciones Cátedra, 2006.
Poemas de amor, de James Laughlin. Ourense, Ediciones Linteo S.L, 2007.

Poetry 

La hermosura del héroe (Premio Vicente Núñez 1993)
Esto es mi cuerpo (Visor, 1997)
Vayamos hacia el norte aunque sea dando la vuelta por el sur (2001)
¿Qué consideración no merecen quienes han cometido atentados contra la belleza del mundo? (2002)
Más hermosura (CELYA, 2002)
Un ángulo me basta (IV Premio Internacional de Poesía Generación del 27, Visor, 2002)
Olímpicas (El Gaviero Ediciones, 2005)
Eros es más (XIX Premio Loewe, Visor, 2007).
Del lado del amor (Poesía reunida 1994-2009)

Essays 

Epitafio del fuego: IX Encuentro de Poetas Iberoamericanos : antología en homenaje a José Emilio Pacheco, celebrado en Salamanca en 2006. Juan Antonio González Iglesias y Francisca Noguerol Jiménez. Salamanca. Fundación Salamanca Ciudad de Cultura, 2006
Antonio de Nebrija: Edad Media y Renacimiento. Coloquio Humanista Antonio de Nebrija (1 . 1992. Salamanca) Carmen Codoñer y Juan Antonio González Iglesias. Salamanca. Universidad de Salamanca. Ediciones Universidad Salamanca, 1997.

References

1964 births
Living people
People from Salamanca
Spanish poets
Spanish male poets